Doug Chapman may refer to:

 Doug Chapman (stuntman), Canadian stunt performer and actor
 Doug Chapman (American football) (born 1977), American former running back
 Doug Chapman (Australian footballer) (1889–1975), Australian rules footballer
 Doug Chapman (ice hockey) (born 1930), Canadian hockey player
 Douglas Chapman (politician) (born 1955), Member of Parliament for Dunfermline & West Fife since 2015